is a manga series, written and illustrated by Osamu Tezuka in 1948.

Plot 
A new planet begins to approach Earth. Scientists know nothing about the planet and decide to venture to it in order to discover its inhabitants and conditions. They discover that it is inhabited by dinosaurs and bears a resemblance to ancient Earth. The planet, named Mamango, broke off from Earth 5 million years ago and has come back for the first time since. The team soon discovers that criminals have stowed away on their space ship and that they have come to Mamango for their own devious reasons.

Characters 

 Shunsaku Ban
 A detective investigating a murder that is somehow linked to the mysterious Planet Mamango.
 Kenichi Shikishima
 A bright young boy who realizes the powerful potential of rocks from Planet Mamango.
 Makeru Butamo
 A captain who pilots the rocket ship built by Kenichi to the Planet Mamango for an exploratory expedition.
 Sekken Kao
 A criminal who seeks the power of Planet Mamango.
 Doctor Jupiter
 A character modelled after Popeye (in fact, there are several American cartoon characters present in this book, including Dagwood and Mickey Mouse).

Publication
In Japan, Lost World was published in two volumes by Fuji Shobo. The first had the subtitle "The Earth", and the second was subtitled "The Universe"

When the English adaptation was published in the United States on July 30, 2003, both books were combined into a single volume .

Legacy
Lost World is the first of Osamu Tezuka's early epic science fiction trilogy, consisting of Lost World (1948), Metropolis (1949) and Nextworld (1951). They were some of the earliest works featuring steampunk elements, which have since consistently appeared in mainstream manga. These steampunk elements eventually made their way into mainstream anime productions starting in the 1970s, with television shows including Leiji Matsumoto's Space Battleship Yamato (1974), Hayao Miyazaki's Future Boy Conan (1978), and the 1979 anime adaptation of Riyoko Ikeda's manga Rose of Versailles (1972).

See also 
 List of Osamu Tezuka manga
 List of Osamu Tezuka anime
 Metropolis (2001 film)
 Fumoon

References

External links 
 Official Lost World page at publisher Dark Horse Comics, Inc.
 

1948 manga
Akita Shoten manga
Dark Horse Comics titles
Osamu Tezuka manga
Science fiction anime and manga
Steampunk anime and manga